The 1998–1999 season was the 120th season in Bolton Wanderers F.C.'s existence, and their first season back in the Football League First Division after relegation from the Premier League. It covers the period from 1 July 1998 to 30 June 1999.

Results

Nationwide League Division One

Nationwide League Division One play-offs

F.A. Cup

Worthington Cup

Appearances
Bolton used a total of 27 players during the season.

Top scorers

References

 

1998-99
Bol